Listen to the Doctors is the sixth studio album release from the Hard rock band Dr. Sin. It is a cover album containing only songs that contain the word "Doctor" in their titles. Covered bands include Kiss, The Beatles, The Rolling Stones, Black Sabbath, Motörhead, and a jazz cover of Joe "King" Oliver.

Track listing
"Calling Dr. Love" (Kiss) – 4:29
"Dr. Rock" (Motörhead) – 5:30
"Doctor Doctor" (UFO) – 3:19
"Dr. Feelgood" (Mötley Crüe) – 4:53
"Just what the Doctor Ordered" (Ted Nugent) – 2:36
"Dear Doctor" (The Rolling Stones) – 3:25
"The Doctor" (The Doobie Brothers) – 5:08
"I Don't Need no Doctor" (Ray Charles) – 2:34
"Rock 'n' Roll Doctor" (Black Sabbath) – 4:18
"Somebody Get me a Doctor" (Van Halen) – 2:50
"Doctor Robert" (The Beatles) – 3:28
"Doctor Jazz" (Joe "King" Oliver) – 5:21

Personnel
 Andria Busic – (Bass/Vocals)
 Ivan Busic – (Drums/Backing Vocals)
 Eduardo Ardanuy – (Guitars)

References

2005 albums
Dr. Sin albums